The 2010–11 Binghamton Senators season was the American Hockey League franchise's ninth season of play. It was the Senators' first season under head coach Kurt Kleinendorst. The Senators finished the season in fifth place in the East division, qualifying for the Calder Cup playoffs for the first time since 2004–05. In the playoffs, the Senators defeated the Houston Aeros four games to two in the Calder Cup Finals to capture their first Calder Cup Championship. The Senators captain was Ryan Keller. The Senators alternate captains were Cody Bass and Derek Smith.

Divisional standings

Schedule and results

Regular season

Postseason

Roster

Binghamton Senators
Bing
Bing